Kateřina Mrázová (born 19 October 1992) is a Czech ice hockey forward and member of the Czech national team, currently playing in the Premier Hockey Federation (PHF) with the Connecticut Whale. Known for her stickhandling skill, she was the first European player to win the Clarkson Cup, winning the championship with the Boston Blades in 2013, and the first Czech player to score a goal in the National Women's Hockey League (NWHL; renamed PHF in 2021).

Playing career
Her first season in the Canadian Women's Hockey League (CWHL) was in 2012–13. She played with the Boston Blades under the direction of head coach Digit Murphy and was used as a defensive forward. She contributed to the Blades' first regular season title and helped them secure the 2013 Clarkson Cup. She was the first European to win the coveted trophy.

After her rookie CWHL season, she left the league to play college ice hockey with the Minnesota Duluth Bulldogs women's ice hockey program in the Western Collegiate Hockey Association (WCHA) conference of the NCAA Division I. She stayed with the program for five seasons, though a knee injury kept her from playing for the entire 2015–16 season. Across 117 games, she scored 75 points and was named to the 2016–17 WCHA All-Academic Team.

On 11 July 2018, Mrázová returned to professional hockey and signed a contract with the Connecticut Whale of the NWHL. Along with Denisa Křížová, she was one of the first two Czech players to play in the NWHL and became the first Czech player to pick up a point. She logged 12 points in 15 games in the 2018–19 season with the Whale. On 20 October 2018, she scored the Whale's first power-play goal since mid-February 2018.

She played one year in the NWHL before returning to Europe to sign with Brynäs IF of the SDHL. She scored 51 points in 34 games in her debut SDHL season, the fourth leading scorer in the league and top of the league in assists, and added another 10 points in 5 playoff games as Brynäs were defeated by Luleå HF/MSSK in the semi-finals.

International 
She represented Czechia at three IIHF U18 Women’s World Championships, being named an assistant captain in the 2010 tournament where the country finished in seventh.

Mrázová competed with the Czech Republic at the 2013 IIHF Women’s World Championships. The tournament marked the first time the Czech Republic competed at the Top Division level. Although the Czechs lost to Sweden in the relegation round, Mrázová accumulated 2 points on two assists during the tournament.

She has competed in three Olympic qualification tournaments with Czechia, getting two points in three games in 2009 and scoring one goal in three games in 2013, the country failing to qualify both times. She notched three points in three games for Czechia's 2017 Olympic qualification run, the country ultimately failing to qualify for the 2018 Winter Olympics.

Career statistics

International

References

External links
 
 

1992 births
Living people
Boston Blades players
Brynäs IF Dam players
Clarkson Cup champions
Connecticut Whale (PHF) players
Czech expatriate ice hockey players in Sweden
Czech expatriate ice hockey players in the United States
Czech women's ice hockey forwards
Ice hockey players at the 2022 Winter Olympics
Minnesota Duluth Bulldogs women's ice hockey players
Olympic ice hockey players of the Czech Republic
Ice hockey people from Prague